Kirch Stücker See is a lake in Nordwestmecklenburg, Mecklenburg-Vorpommern, Germany. At an elevation of 40 m, its surface area is 0.37 km².

Lakes of Mecklenburg-Western Pomerania